"She Is Love" is the debut single by American pop rock band, Parachute, and is the lead single from their debut album, Losing Sleep. It was released on May 13, 2009. It is their only song to enter the Billboard Hot 100 to date, peaking at #66. The song is also their most successful single to date, as it entered the Adult Alternative Songs, Adult Contemporary, Adult Pop Songs, Heatseekers Songs, Japan Hot 100 charts and is certified Gold by the RIAA. The album version was produced by Chris Keup/Stewart Myers. The full band version was produced by Kyle Kelso. Songwriter Will Anderson said that he tried to write a very simple love song that he could sing in front of a room full of girls he was trying to get to come to a show.

Charts

Weekly charts

Year-end charts

Sales and certifications

References

2009 debut singles
Parachute (band) songs
2009 songs